Jeff Wyatt Wilson is an American film director, screenwriter and producer based out of Nashville, Tennessee.

Wilson has worked in film and TV productions such as Breakfast with Einstein and Krippendorf's Tribe with various networks from Showtime (the Holocaust Series) to Nickelodeon (And Now This…), CMT and MTV as well as independent projects including Gummo directed by Harmony Korine and the feature documentary "Any Day Now" under Wilson's direction that followed the American Songwriter and (BMI) Broadcast Music, Inc. sponsored Ten Out of Tenn Tour which premiered and was 1st runner-up at the Nashville Film Festival.

Recognition

Awards and honors

Filmography

Directorial work

 I Credited as editor
 II Credited as cinematographer

References

External links

 
 Jeff Wyatt Wilson's Official Website

American cinematographers
American film editors
Film producers from Tennessee
American male screenwriters
Science fiction film directors
Film directors from Tennessee
Year of birth missing (living people)
Living people
People from Nashville, Tennessee
Screenwriters from Tennessee